Vithaya Pansringarm (born 11 August 1959) is a Thai actor best known for appearing in Only God Forgives. He is also known in Thailand as "Pu Vithaya".

Vithaya graduated in Graphic Design from New York Institute of Technology. He holds a 5th Degree Black Belt (5 DAN) in Kendo (a Japanese martial art) and is President of the Thailand Kendo Club.

Career

In June 2014, he won Best Actor at the Shanghai International Film Festival for his role as Chavoret in The Last Executioner, a film based on the true life story of Thailand's last person to carry out executions by gun. The film also won 'Best Picture' and 'Best Screen Play' at the 30th Surasawadi Awards in 2015.

Filmography

References

External links
 

Vithaya Pansringarm
Living people
Place of birth missing (living people)
1959 births
Vithaya Pansringarm
New York Institute of Technology alumni